John Henry Barrow (1817 – 22 August 1874) was a Congregational minister, journalist and South Australian politician.

Early life
Barrow was born in England, son of John Barrow.  After he studied for the Congregational ministry at Hackney College, he took charge of the Congregational Church at Market Drayton in Shropshire, where he also ran a school. He was then transferred to Bradford, Yorkshire where he began writing for the Bradford Observer.

Career in Australia
Barrow emigrated to Adelaide, South Australia, in the hope that a change of climate would be beneficial to the health of his invalid wife, arriving in September 1853 on the Hannah Maria with his wife and four children, and obtained a position in the office of the South Australian Register. He also did work on the literary side and, when Andrew Garran went to Sydney, succeeded him as principal leader writer. He began preaching to an Independent congregation which met at "Maesbury House", the residence of John Roberts in Kensington, South Australia. The Clayton Chapel (later Clayton Congregational Church) was built for him, but though an excellent preacher, Barrow was unsure whether his real work lay in church life, and he resigned his pastorate in 1858 to enter the South Australian House of Assembly as the member for East Torrens.

He was, with Philip H. Burden and E. Jones, a tenant of Samuel R. and John H. Kearne's property "Oaklands" (now the suburbs of Oaklands Park and Warradale).

Also in 1858 Barrow left the Register to become editor, manager and co-founder of The South Australian Advertiser, whose first issue appeared on 12 July 1858. The first number of the Weekly Chronicle came out five days later, and in 1863 the Express was started as an evening paper. Though these papers were conducted with ability, the controlling company did not prosper, and it was wound up in 1864. The papers passed into the hands of a proprietary of eight persons of whom Barrow was one, and in 1871 Barrow and Thomas King became the sole proprietors. Barrow was editor of the Advertiser until his final illness and death a few months later.

The editing of a newspaper is a sufficiently exacting piece of work for most people, but Barrow was a man of tireless energy and contrived also to carry out the duties of a member of parliament during nearly the whole of this period. He did not seek re-election for the assembly in 1860 but in 1861 became a member of the South Australian Legislative Council. In 1870 he was one of the South Australian delegates to the intercolonial conference held at Melbourne. In 1871 he resigned from the council, and the following year was returned to the South Australian House of Assembly for Sturt.  He joined the seventh Henry Ayers ministry as Treasurer of South Australia in March 1872, holding the position until Ayers resigned in July 1873.

John Barrow was also the first Mayor of the newly created municipality of the Town of Unley, and was an active member of the South Australian Free Rifle Corps.

Late life
In mid-1873, Barrow's health declined, and though he went to the intercolonial conference at Sydney as one of the South Australian delegates in the hope that change of scene might lead to its improvement, it continued to deteriorate; he died in Adelaide on 22 August 1874 of an effusion on the brain. He was married twice and left a widow, three sons and three daughters. Barrow left behind him a reputation in his own time as a speaker and journalist.

Family
Barrow was married to Sarah Barrow née Liversedge (c. 1814 – 4 October 1856). Their children included:
Sarah Ann Barrow (1844– ) married Edward "Ned" Jones of Oaklands, Yorke Peninsula on 29 January 1864
John Thomas Barrow (c. 1846 – ) married Annie Jones in 1874, was a surveyor in Adelaide; land agent in Victoria; Inspector of Lands in Western Australia 1908–1913, lived South Perth. Annie was a daughter of Capt. T. P. Jones
John Henry Barrow married Ethel May Farmer on 30 December 1905.
T. G. A. Barrow ( – 30 March 1918) killed in France during WWI.
Mary Eleanore Barrow (c. 1847 – 12 July 1937) married Abraham Walter Bishop (1847–1925) on 6 October 1872, lived in Nausori, Fiji, died in New Zealand.
George L. Barrow (May 1851 – 11 August 1925), a journalist who was jailed for libel, then lived in Victoria, then Western Australia and Fiji, where he died. 
Margaretta Anna Barrow (c. 1853 – 16 July 1937) married Henry Lancaster Beddome ( – ) on 17 February 1881. The two sisters died in the same week.
On 15 August 1865 Barrow married again, to Mary Burden (died 10 May 1907), the widow of Philip H. Burden (c. 1823 – 3 March 1864), and adopted her children, who included 
Philip Henry Burden, Jr. (1851 – 5 October 1902), the eldest adopted son, married Rachel Ann English (died 23 August 1940) on 25 February 1875. She was a daughter of Thomas English. 
Frederic Britten Burden (1852 – 30 January 1897) married Ada Hallett on 20 May 1879. He was a businessman and newspaper editor in South Australia
Annie Burden (1854 – )
Florence Burden (13 November 1858 – 19 January 1939) married Dr. William Thornborough Hayward (26 June 1854 – 21 December 1928) on 26 June 1879. Florence, also writing as "Firenze", was a published author.

Mary married again, to Benjamin Cowderoy on 25 November 1878.

References

 

|-

|-

Further reading
 

1817 births
1874 deaths
Members of the South Australian House of Assembly
Members of the South Australian Legislative Council
Australian newspaper editors
19th-century Australian journalists
Male journalists
Treasurers of South Australia
19th-century Australian male writers
19th-century Australian politicians
English emigrants to colonial Australia